Assentoft is a town on the peninsula of Jutland, with a population of 3,811 (2022). The town is located eight kilometers east of Randers, and is a part of Randers Municipality in the Central Denmark Region.

History

Prehistory 
In present Assentoft there have been found remains of e.g. a round barrow with a grave from the Stone Age, two round barrows from Antiquity, a settlement from the late Bronze Age, and another settlement which seems to have been inhabited from the late Stone Age to the late Iron Age.

Name 
In place names the last particle -toft means "the adapted", and refers to an area which is adapted to a house. A toft was therefore perhaps first an area specified for settlement by a farm owner in a village. Names with -toft must to a wide extent be from the Viking Age, as there are many names with -toft in England and Normandy.

In settlement names with the last particle –toft, the first particle is often a Nordic first name - in this case perhaps Asgun. However, in some cases the first particle refers to e.g. animals, terrain or vegetation, and the first particle in Assentoft is probably the Old Danish word æsking, which means "ash stand". An inhabitant of Assentoft is supposedly called an Esking.

Early history 
In the hundred Haldherred the church Essenbæk (Eskingbec) was probably built in the 12th century in the middle of Essenbæk Parish, which was an annex of Virring Parish from age-old time. Most of Essenbæk Parish was tenured to Essenbæk Abbey, and at the latest from March 9, 1467, Essenbæk Farm (Æskinbechgard; Essenbækgård) stood by the church.

Modern history 

After the Reformation, the king confiscated Essenbæk Abbey and its estate in 1540, and from 1579 Assentoft (Assentofftt) is known. When it, Essenbæk Farm and e.g. Essenbæk Mill (Essenbech Møllested; Essenbæk Mølle) were acquired August 22, 1661 from the king by Hans Friis, there were 10 farms, four smallholdings and five houses in what was then Assentoft. The town's location on moraine hills shows that agriculture was prioritized there, but cattle was probably kept on the meadows below the town.

Hans Friis gave March 18, 1695 Essenbæk Home Farm (Essenbæk Ladegård), including adjoining estates, to his nephew Christian Friis, who February 15, 1726 incorporated them in the entailed estate of Tustrup. In 1739 the estate owner established a school in Assentoft, but October 30, 1782 the king gave permission to sell the estate. Essenbæk Home Farm was sold at auction at Tustrup December 18, 1783 to Christian Kallager, and June 11, 1785, the deed was signed.

However, already June 10, 1787 he sold it to Peter Severin Fønss and Johan Frederik Carøe. Essenbæk Farm was sold in 1789 to Niels Christensen Kutsch, and the next year Assentoft was sold to the tenant farmers in the village. When they subdivided it to each other July 15, 1790, there were nine whole farms, two half farms, four smallholdings and four houses in Assentoft.

Within each pastorage, i.e. main parish and its annex(es), was established in 1803 a municipal parish, which from January 1, 1868 was called parish municipality. One such was Virring-Essenbæk Municipality, which e.g. included Assentoft.

In 1840 a new and larger school was built in the village. The then decrepit church in Essenbæk Parish was torn down in the autumn of 1865, and November 28, 1869, the consecration of a new Essenbæk Church in Assentoft occurred. At that time the village was growing north of the highway.

In Assentoft the Savings and Loans Bank of Virring and Essenbæk Parishes (Virring og Essenbæk Sognes Spare- og Laanekasse) was established in 1871. To provide medical assistance for its members, the Craftmen's Society of Essenbæk Parish (Essenbæk Sogns Haandværkerforening) was established March 6 of the same year, and in the summer of 1889 the society had built in Assentoft the Foundation of the Craftmen's Society of Essenbæk Parish (Essenbæk Sogns Haandværkerforenings Stiftelse), called the village hall. In it was a taproom, a gathering hall and six free retirement homes. Assentoft Waterworks (Assentoft Vandværk) was established May 15, 1895.

January 26, 1900 the Assentoft Co-operative Society (Assentoft Brugsforening) was established, the newly built store of which opened for sale July 1 of the same year. In 1907 a new and larger school was built in the village, and Essenbæk Mill  - rebuilt after a fire April 23, 1889 - was torn down in 1922.

July 23, 1937 motorcycle racing occurred the first time on Volk Mill (Volk Mølle) hills at Essenbæk Farm. The track that was raced on was then ca. 300 meters long with a steep elevation at last, and typically ordinary motorcycles that were converted for it on site were raced there. In 1939 Assentoft Sports Club (Assentoft Idrætsforening) was established, which from that year participated in series football.

All motoring races were suspended while the Second World War  was fought, but from 1946 hill climbing for motorcycles was again raced on Volk Mill hills. From that time many of the races on the track could attract 10,000-20,000 spectators. In 1949 the only Danish hill climbing championship was raced there. 
Motocross was first raced on Volk Mill hills April 20, 1951. Then the track that was raced on was 750 meters long. In the autumn of 1954 the then 2,500 meters long track was approved by international track inspection, and August 28, 1955 Motocross des Nations was raced there with 24 participants and ca. 40,000 spectators. The first photograph that was elected as World Press Photo of the Year shows one of the race's participants that crashes on the track.

From 1954 there were no retirement homes in the village hall, as they were outmoded, but November 6, 1957 the new Essenbæk House (Essenbækhus) was opened as retirement homes on the village hall's previous kitchen garden.
 
In the 1950s and 1960s several national and international motocross races, including world championships and both European and Danish championships, occurred on Volk Mill hills, and from the beginning of the 1960s trials too. Also in the beginning of the 1960s the first single-family house neighborhoods were established in Assentoft by the western part of the village, and Assentoft Sports Club was united with Langkastrup Gymnastics Association (Langkastrup Gymnastikforening) as Sønderhald Sports Club (Sønderhald Idrætsforening) April 25, 1964.

In 1966 the Savings and Loans Bank of Virring and Essenbæk Parishes was acquired by the Savings Bank for Randers Town and Environs (Sparekassen for Randers By og Omegn), and in 1968 the village hall was sold, and then refashioned as Assentoft Inn (Assentoft Kro). That same year the last race with spectators occurred on Volk Mill hills, and in 1969 the last training race occurred there.

E.g. Virring-Essenbæk Municipality was superseded April 1, 1970 by Sønderhald Municipality, and November 11, 1970, it decided to establish the residential area of Assentoft East (Assentoft Øst) by Essenbæk Farm. From February 28, 1973, the municipality decided to expand the residential area with e.g. parts of the nearby village Drastrup, including the Sønderhald School (Sønderhaldskolen), which is now getting to be surrounded by  Assentoft.

At the Sønderhald School was built from June to October 1975 the sports hall Assentoft Gymnasium (Assentofthallen), which was opened for use October 25 of the same year. The Essenbæk School (Essenbækskolen) was built near the Sønderhald School in 1979, and beside the Assentoft Gymnasium  another sports hall was built which was opened for use November 14, 1980. A community centre added to the Assentoft Gymnasiums (Assentofthallerne), which the two sports halls are collectively called, was opened for use in the spring of 1981.
 
November 12, 1986 the municipality decided to establish the industrial area of Virkevangen in Assentoft East, and in 1989 the Sønderhald School and the Essenbæk School were united as the Assentoft School (Assentoftskolen). Sønderhald Sports Club became SIF Assentoft in June 2011.

Demography

Geography 

Most of Assentofts northern rim lies on the top of a ca. 50 meters high slope between the riverine meadows and the moraine hills south of Randers Fjord. The deep erosion gullies are wooded, and promontory by promontory used for the growth of the town. However, certain parts of the town lie down on steep plots closely surrounded by wood and meadows, so close to nature that one can e.g. see roe deer grazing in the gardens. From the towns southern side the flatter moraine landscape is seen.

Infrastructure 
The infrastructure in Assentoft consists primarily of tranquil residential streets. To especially the town's residential areas towards east the Grenå Road south of Assentoft to some degree relieves Storegade, which is also characterized as residential street.

Business 
In the town there is a selection of service and industry, and a few retail stores along Storegade.

Assentoft Silo A/S, which e.g. produces low-oxygen steel silos, was established in the summer of 1940.

Education 
The Assentoft School is with 750 pupils (2013) the largest state school in Randers Municipality.

Notable people 

 Michael Aastrup Jensen (born 1976), politician, Mayor of Randers Town Council in 2002, aged 26

References

Cities and towns in the Central Denmark Region
Randers Municipality